Jesse Rhoades Purnell (May 11, 1881 to July 4, 1966), was a Major League Baseball third baseman who played in  with the Philadelphia Phillies. He batted left and threw right-handed. Purnell had two hits and scored 2 runs in 19 at-bats in seven career games. He was born in Glenside, Pennsylvania, and died in Philadelphia, Pennsylvania.

External links

1881 births
1966 deaths
Major League Baseball third basemen
Baseball players from Pennsylvania
Philadelphia Phillies players
People from Cheltenham, Pennsylvania